Anbulla Kadhalukku is a 1999 Indian Tamil-language romance film written, produced and directed by Mohan, starring Mohan himself alongside Megha, Sangeetha and Bhavana, while Anand Babu and Delhi Ganesh appeared in other pivotal roles. The film opened in September 1999 and faced a poor critical and commercial response.

Cast 
Mohan as Prem
Megha as Geetha
Sangeetha as Priya
Bhavana as Shanti
Visu as Chandrasekhar
Anand Babu as Priya's brother
Delhi Ganesh as Shanti
Vaiyapuri as Vengaipuli
Jai Ganesh as Sundaramoorthy
Anu Mohan
Thyagu as Police inspector
Kumarimuthu
C. R. Saraswathi as Priya's mother
K. S. Jayalakshmi
Scissor Manohar

Production
The film shared a similar storyline to several other Tamil films which released during the same period. Jodi (1999), Minsara Kanna (1999) and Poovellam Kettuppar (1999) all had familiar plots.

Soundtrack 
Soundtrack was composed by Deva.

Release 
The film caused massive losses for Mohan, who went back into his sabbatical from films after the film's release but still opted only to play the lead role in films, turning down an offer to appear as Jayam Ravi's father in Something Something Unakkum Enakkum.

References 

1999 films
1990s Tamil-language films
Indian romance films
Films scored by Deva (composer)
1999 directorial debut films
1999 romance films